Murgisca pyrophoralis is a species of snout moth in the genus Murgisca. It is found in Peru.

References

Moths described in 1916
Chrysauginae